Natalia Obono Abeso Abuy (born 5 September 1986) is an Equatoguinean footballer who played as a midfielder for the Equatorial Guinea women's national football team. She was part of the team at the 2011 FIFA Women's World Cup. At the club level, she plays for Inter Continental in Equatorial Guinea.

References

External links

1986 births
Living people
Place of birth missing (living people)
Equatoguinean women's footballers
Women's association football midfielders
Equatorial Guinea women's international footballers
2011 FIFA Women's World Cup players